Roy Anthony Myers Francis  (born April 13, 1969 in La Francia de Siquirres) is a Costa Rican former football player who played most of his career with Deportivo Saprissa.

Club career
Myers was known as El Maravilloso (The Marvellous) due to his natural talent to play the game, becoming a typical number 10. He made his professional debut for hometown club Limonense but in his country he played mostly with Saprissa, winning three national championships with them, as well as two CONCACAF Champions Cups. During his time with Saprissa, Myers was once suspended for 7 matches after insulting the referee and refusing to leave the pitch. He had several spells abroad, playing in Uruguay with Peñarol in an injury-hit 1992, Pachuca of Mexico in the mid 1990s, Tolima of Colombia in 1997 and later in Major League Soccer, where he played with the MetroStars and the Los Angeles Galaxy.

He finished his career at Cartaginés, where he was suspended for two matches and handed a fine for pushing a referee when three teammates were fined as well.

International career
Myers made his debut for Costa Rica in a June 1990 FIFA World Cup match against Brazil and earned a total of 48 caps, scoring 2 goals. He represented his country in 8 FIFA World Cup qualification matches and played at the 1990 FIFA World Cup held in Italy. He also played at the 1993, 1995 and 1999 UNCAF Nations Cups as well as at the 1993 and 1998 CONCACAF Gold Cups and the 1997 Copa América.

He collected his final cap in September 2000 in a World Cup qualifier against Barbados .

International goals
Scores and results list Costa Rica's goal tally first.

Managerial career
Myers became interim coach at Saprissa on 12 November 2009 but was fired in November 2010. In December 2011 he became assistant at the Costa Rica national under-20 football team.

Personal life
Myers' brother Michael Myers also played professionally and made it to the national team. Roy is married to Rogena McCook and they have two children.

References

External links
 
 
 
 
 

1969 births
Living people
People from Limón Province
Association football midfielders
Costa Rican footballers
Costa Rica international footballers
1990 FIFA World Cup players
1993 CONCACAF Gold Cup players
1997 Copa América players
1998 CONCACAF Gold Cup players
Deportivo Saprissa players
Peñarol players
C.F. Pachuca players
Deportes Tolima footballers
New York Red Bulls players
LA Galaxy players
C.S. Cartaginés players
Costa Rican expatriate footballers
Expatriate footballers in Uruguay
Expatriate footballers in Mexico
Expatriate footballers in Colombia
Expatriate soccer players in the United States
Liga FPD players
Liga MX players
Major League Soccer players
Costa Rican football managers
Deportivo Saprissa managers
Copa Centroamericana-winning players